Regina Marie Rodriguez (born 1963) is a United States district judge of the United States District Court for the District of Colorado.

Early life and education 

Rodriguez was born in 1963 in Gunnison, Colorado, to a Mexican-American father and Japanese-American mother. Her late father, Pete Rodriguez, played football for Western State Colorado University and went on to serve as an assistant coach in the National Football League, which made him one of the league's first Hispanic coaches.

Rodriguez received a Bachelor of Science from the University of Iowa in 1985 and a Juris Doctor from the University of Colorado School of Law in 1988.

Career 

Rodriguez began her legal career as an associate in the law firm of Cooper & Kelly, P.C. (now defunct) from 1988 to 1995. She served as an assistant United States attorney for the United States Attorney's Office for the District of Colorado from 1995 to 2002, during which time she served as the deputy chief of the Civil Division from 1998 to 1999 and as chief of the civil division from 1999 to 2002. In addition, from 1997 to 1998, she served a four-month detail as deputy senior counsel for alternative dispute resolution in the United States Department of Justice. Previously, from 2002 to 2016, she worked in the Denver office of Faegre & Benson LLP (now Faegre Baker Daniels LLP) as a special counsel until she was elevated to partner in 2005. She was a partner in the Denver office of Hogan Lovells from 2016 to 2019, where she specialized in mass tort and product liability defense. She was a partner at WilmerHale from 2019 until she was commissioned as a federal judge.

Federal judicial service

Expired nomination to district court under Obama 

On April 28, 2016, President Barack Obama nominated Rodriguez to serve as a United States district judge of the United States District Court of the District of Colorado, to the seat vacated by Judge Robert E. Blackburn, who assumed senior status on April 12, 2016. Her nomination expired on January 3, 2017, with the end of the 114th Congress.

Renomination to district court under Biden 

On March 30, 2021, President Joe Biden announced his intent to nominate Rodriguez to serve as a United States district judge of the United States District Court for the District of Colorado. On April 19, 2021, her nomination was sent to the Senate. President Biden nominated Rodriguez to the seat vacated by Judge Marcia S. Krieger, who assumed senior status on March 3, 2019. On April 28, 2021, a hearing was held on her nomination before the Senate Judiciary Committee. On May 20, 2021, her nomination was reported out of committee by a 17–5 vote. On June 8, 2021, the United States Senate invoked cloture on her nomination by a 72–28 vote. She was confirmed later that day by a 72–28 vote. She received her judicial commission on July 1, 2021.

See also
List of Asian American jurists
List of Hispanic/Latino American jurists

References

External links 
 
 

1963 births
Living people
20th-century American women lawyers
20th-century American lawyers
21st-century American women lawyers
21st-century American lawyers
21st-century American judges
21st-century American women judges
American judges of Mexican descent
American lawyers of Mexican descent
Assistant United States Attorneys
Colorado lawyers
Hispanic and Latino American judges
Judges of the United States District Court for the District of Colorado
People associated with Hogan Lovells
People from Gunnison, Colorado
United States district court judges appointed by Joe Biden
University of Iowa alumni
University of Colorado Law School alumni